Spotsylvania may refer to:
Spotsylvania County, Virginia
Spotsylvania Courthouse, Virginia, the county seat of Spotsylvania County
 Battle of Spotsylvania Court House during the American Civil War
 Spotsylvania County Public Schools, a public school district serving Spotsylvania County, Virginia
 Spotsylvania Middle School, a middle school in Spotsylvania County, Virginia
 Spotsylvania High School, a high school in Spotsylvania County, Virginia
 Spotsylvania Towne Centre, a mall in Fredericksburg, Virginia
 Spotsylvania (VRE station)